Alfred Henry Lloyd (January 3, 1864 – May 11, 1927) was an American philosopher.

Life
Lloyd received both his B.A. and M.A. degrees from Harvard. He studied philosophy at Göttingen University and Heidelberg University, before returning to Harvard for his Ph.D., which he received in 1893. Upon returning from Europe in 1891, Lloyd was recruited by John Dewey as an instructor in philosophy at the University of Michigan. He remained there his entire career, becoming full professor in 1906. He was named dean of the Graduate School in 1915.

Lloyd was interim president of the University of Michigan from February 26 through September 1925, following the death of Marion LeRoy Burton.  He was succeeded by Clarence Cook Little. Lloyd's daughter, Alice Crocker Lloyd, served as the Dean of Women.

Works
Lloyd was the author of five books—Citizenship and Salvation (1897), Dynamic Idealism (1898), Philosophy of History (1899), The Will to Doubt (1907), and Leadership and Progress (1922)—and over 70 articles.

The Will to Doubt
The Will to Doubt was Lloyd's fourth book and was published as a volume in the Ethical Library Series. The book was a response to William James' 1896 collection of essays titled The Will to Believe. Professor Lloyd's simple thesis is that "doubt is essential to real belief". He wrote at the beginning of the 20th century, in what he called an age of doubt:

Fear is a chief motivator of dogmatism, and dogmatic people are slaves to their fears. This is not genuine confidence. But doubt is not the road to atheism; in fact, doubt is part of a very difficult road to theism.

Bertrand Russell built upon these arguments in subsequent years, even directly referencing Lloyd in Free Thought and Official Propaganda.

See also
American philosophy
List of American philosophers

References

Further reading
Evelyn Urban Shirk, Adventurous Idealism: The Philosophy of Alfred Lloyd, University of Michigan Press, 1952.

External links
 
 

1864 births
1927 deaths
Philosophers from New Jersey
Harvard University alumni
People from Montclair, New Jersey
University of Michigan faculty